Geerts is a Dutch patronymic surname, meaning "son of Geert". Notable people with the surname include:

André Geerts (1955-2010), Belgian comics author, creator of Jojo
Charles Geerts (born 1930), Belgian football goalkeeper
Charles Geerts (born 1943), Dutch brothel owner
Christiane Geerts (b. 1940s), Belgian racing cyclist
Geert Geerts, birth name of Erasmus (c.1467-1536), Dutch Renaissance humanist
Frans Geerts (1869–1957), Belgian painter
Karel Hendrik Geerts (1807–1855), Belgian sculptor
Paul Geerts (born 1937), Belgian comic strip author, main artist of the Spike and Suzy series from 1972-2002
Wim Geerts (born ca. 1963), Dutch ambassador and Secretary of Defense
Jago Geerts (born 2000), Belgian motocross rider

See also
Geert
Geurts (disambiguation)

Dutch-language surnames
Patronymic surnames
Surnames from given names